Hassan El-Said (born 1 January 1924) is a Lebanese fencer. He competed at the 1960 and 1964 Summer Olympics.

References

External links
 

1924 births
Possibly living people
Lebanese male épée fencers
Olympic fencers of Lebanon
Fencers at the 1960 Summer Olympics
Fencers at the 1964 Summer Olympics